is a former Japanese athlete who specialized in the 100 meters and long jump. He won the 100 m at the Japanese national championship on five occasions in 1996, 1997, 2000, 2001 and 2002, and he took part in the Olympics four times in 1996, 2000, 2004 and 2008. He represented Japan six times at the World Championships in Athletics.

At global-level championships, he reached the semifinals five times: at the 1996 Olympics and the World Championships in 1997, 2001, 2003 and 2007. He also finished twelfth in the long jump final at the 1995 World Championships. In addition, he won silver medals in both 100 m and 4 x 100 m relay at the 2002 Asian Games.

Career

Early career
Asahara started out as a long jump specialist and he won a silver medal at the 1990 Asian Junior Championships with a jump of 7.49 meters. He gained his first major regional medal at the 1993 East Asian Games in May, where he took a silver with a jump of 7.93 m to finish behind Nai Hui-Fang. He won the 1993 Asian Championships in a new championship record and career best of 8.13 m (a mark which was broken in 1995 by Huang Geng).

He began to establish himself as Japan's top long jumper, winning the event at the Japanese national championships for the first time in 1994, and going on to two more national titles in 1995 and 1997 (missing out to Shigeru Tagawa in 1996). He completed a 100 m and long jump double at the 1997 National Sports Festival of Japan.

He set three Japanese records in the 100 meters, with 10.19 seconds in 1993, 10.14 seconds in 1996 and 10.08 seconds in 1997. He recorded 10.17 seconds at 35 years old in 2008.

Olympic medal and retirement
Asahara represented Japan at the 2008 Summer Olympics in Beijing, competing at the 100 meters sprint. He placed fourth in his first round heat behind Michael Frater, Pierre Brown and Darrel Brown, normally causing elimination. However his time of 10.25 was the fastest losing time and he advanced to the second round. There he could not repeat himself, ending up in eighth place with a time of 10.37 seconds. Together with Shingo Suetsugu, Shinji Takahira and Naoki Tsukahara he also competed at the 4x100 metres relay. In their qualification heat they placed second in behind Trinidad and Tobago, but in front of the Netherlands and Brazil. Their time of 38.52 was the third fastest out of sixteen participating nations in the first round and they qualified for the final. There they sprinted to a time of 38.15 seconds, the third time after the Jamaican and Trinidad teams, winning the bronze medal. It was the first Olympic medal for Japan in 80 years in track races. The medal was upgraded to a silver after the Jamaicans were DQ'ed due to Nesta Carter's positive doping sample.

On 23 September 2008, he retired from competitive athletics at the Kawasaki Super Meet, finishing third in the 100 m  behind Mark Lewis-Francis and Michael Rodgers. After being greeted on the podium by Usain Bolt, Asahara said "It wasn't my best race, but it was exciting to run in front of so many fans. It was quite appropriate for my final race." After his retirement he was employed by Osaka Gas and opened an athletics training camp for children.

Personal life
Nobuharu Asahara married synchronised swimmer Fumiko Okuno in 2002. They have 3 children together.

Personal bests

All information taken from IAAF profile.

Records
100 metres
Former Japanese record holder - 10.08 s (wind: +0.8 m/s) (Lausanne, 2 July 1997)
Former Japanese university record holder - 10.19 s (wind: +2.0 m/s) (Naruto, 26 October 1993)
4×100 m relay
Former Asian record holder - 38.03 s (relay leg: 4th) (Osaka, 1 September 2007)
Medley relay (100m×200m×300m×400m)
Current Japanese record holder - 1:48.27 s (relay leg: 2nd) (Yokohama, 15 September 2001)
50 metres (Indoor)
Current Japanese record holder - 5.75 s (Liévin, 24 February 2002)
60 metres (Indoor)
Current Japanese record holder - 6.55 s (Sindelfingen, 1 March 1997)
100 metres (Indoor)
Current Asian record (Asian best) holder - 10.41 s (Tampere, 4 February 2002)

 with Naoki Tsukahara, Shingo Suetsugu, and Shinji Takahira
 with Shingo Kawabata, Kenji Tabata, and Jun Osakada

International competition record

National Championship
He has won the individual national championship eight times.
5 wins in the 100 metres (1996, 1997, 2000, 2001, 2002)
3 wins in the long jump (1994, 1995, 1997)

References

External links

Nobuharu Asahara at JAAF 

1972 births
Living people
Sportspeople from Kobe
Japanese male sprinters
Japanese male long jumpers
Olympic male sprinters
Olympic male long jumpers
Olympic athletes of Japan
Olympic silver medalists for Japan
Olympic bronze medalists for Japan
Olympic bronze medalists in athletics (track and field)
Athletes (track and field) at the 1996 Summer Olympics
Athletes (track and field) at the 2000 Summer Olympics
Athletes (track and field) at the 2004 Summer Olympics
Athletes (track and field) at the 2008 Summer Olympics
Medalists at the 2008 Summer Olympics
Asian Games silver medalists for Japan
Asian Games medalists in athletics (track and field)
Athletes (track and field) at the 2002 Asian Games
Medalists at the 2002 Asian Games
World Athletics Championships athletes for Japan
Asian Athletics Championships winners
Japan Championships in Athletics winners
20th-century Japanese people
21st-century Japanese people